City and Westminster Properties (1934) Ltd v Mudd [1959] Ch 129 is an English contract law case, regarding the parol evidence rule. It illustrates one of the large exceptions, that a written document is not deemed to be exhaustive of the parties intentions when there is clear evidence of a collateral contract. It shows that even evidence from outside a written agreement may contradict evidence inside it.

Facts
The lease said the tenant could use No 4 New Cavendish Street, London, for business purposes only. Mr Mudd, the tenant was an antique dealer. He had been assured he could live in the back room of the shop and using the basement a living space as a wartime arrangement since 1941. The written agreements followed from 1943 and excluded using the premises to live since 1947. In 1957, after some changes of landlord and caution of surveyors, the new landlord tried to eject Mr Mudd. Mr Mudd refused to leave and was brought to court.

Counsel for the landlord (City and Westminster Properties) argued that reasonable notice was being given and therefore it could not fall within the High Trees case. Mr Mudd had no right to remain.

Judgment
Harman J held that there was a collateral contract that he could stay even if it contradicted the written agreement's express terms. He said there was no need to look at the question of estoppel, because there was a clear assurance preceding the contract.

See also
Allen v Pink (1838) 4 M&W 140, setting out the basic parol evidence rule
Jacobs v Batavia & General Plantations Trust Ltd [1924] 1 Ch 287
Government of Zanzibar v British Aerospace (Lancaster House) Ltd [2000] 1 WLR 2333, parties can explicitly contract to make the written document exhaustive, saying ‘this is the entire agreement’, etc.
Angell v Duke (1875) 32 LT 320
Henderson v Arthur [1907] 1 KB 10
Business Environment Bow Lane Ltd v Deanwater Estates Ltd [2007] EWCA Civ 622

Exceptions where parol evidence is admissible
Gillespie Bros & Co v Cheney, Eggar & Co [1986] 2 QB 59, to prove that terms need to be implied in the agreement
Hutton v Warren (1836) 1 M&W 466, to prove custom to be implied in the agreement
Campbell Discount Co v Gall [1961] 1 QB 431, to show the contract is invalid for misrepresentation, mistake, fraud or non est factum and to show a document should be rectified
Pym v Campbell (1856) 6E&B 370, to show a contract is not yet operative, or has ceased
Mann v Nunn (1874) 30 LT 526, to prove a collateral agreement exists

Notes

References
Andrew Burrows, Casebook on Contract (Hart 2007) 157, "the better view is that there is no such rule. The so-called rule merely indicates that, where terms have been reduced to writing, there is an evidential burden of proof on a party alleging that there are other binding terms."
Lord Wedderburn, ‘Collateral Contract’ (1959) Cambridge Law Journal 58 says the rule is "no more than a self evident tautology… when the writing is the whole contract, the parties are bound by it and parol evidence is excluded; when it is not, evidence of the other terms must be admitted."
The Law Commission (No 154 Cmnd 9700 (1986) agreed, that it is "no more than a circular statement."

English incorporation case law
High Court of Justice cases
1959 in British law
1959 in case law